Markus Bähr (born 10 September 1974) is a German former professional footballer who played as a midfielder.

References

1974 births
Living people
German footballers
Association football midfielders
Germany youth international footballers
Karlsruher SC players
1. FC Köln players
SC Pfullendorf players
Bundesliga players
2. Bundesliga players